Schinia erythrias is a moth of the family Noctuidae. It is only known from Durango, Mexico.

The length of the fore wings is 12–13 mm for males. Adults are on wing in late August.

External links
Nomenclatural validation of three North American species of Heliothinae

Schinia
Moths of Central America
Moths described in 2006